Stanley Cole may refer to:
 Stanley Cole (water polo) (1945–2018), American water polo player
 Stanley Cole (architect) (1924–2013), American architect
 Stanley Cole (politician) (1860–1942), Australian politician